Homonota is a genus of South American geckos, commonly known as marked geckos.

Species & subspecies
Homonota andicola Cei, 1978 – Cei's marked gecko 
Homonota borellii (Peracca, 1897) – Borelli's marked gecko
Homonota darwinii Boulenger, 1885 – Darwin's marked gecko
Homonota darwinii darwinii Boulenger, 1885
Homonota darwinii macrocephala Cei, 1978
Homonota fasciata (A.M.C. Duméril & Bibron, 1836) – South American marked gecko
Homonota horrida (Burmeister, 1861) – South American marked gecko
Homonota itambere Cabral & Cacciali, 2021
Homonota marthae Cacciali, Morando, L. Avila & G. Köhler, 2018
Homonota rupicola Cacciali, I. Ávila & Bauer, 2007
Homonota septentrionalis Cacciali, Morando, Medina, G. Köhler, Motte & L. Avila, 2017 
Homonota taragui Cajade, Etchepare, Falcione, Barrasso & Alvarez, 2013
Homonota underwoodi Kluge, 1964 – Underwood's marked gecko
Homonota uruguayensis (Vaz-Ferreira & Sierra de Soriano, 1961) - Uruguay marked gecko
Homonota whitii Boulenger, 1885 - Argentine marked gecko
Homonota williamsii L. Ávila, Perez, Minoli & Morando, 2012

Nota bene: A binomial authority or trinomial authority in parentheses indicates that the species or subspecies was originally described in a genus other than Homonota.

Geographic range
Species within this genus are known to occur in many parts of South America.

References

Further reading
Boulenger GA (1885). Catalogue of the Lizards in the British Museum (Natural History). Second Edition. Volume I. Gekkonidæ ... London: Trustees of the British Museum (Natural History). (Taylor and Francis, printers). xii + 436 pp. + Plates I-XXXII. (Genus Homonota, p. 21), (Homonota darwinii, new species, pp. 21–22 + Plate III, Figure 7), (Homonota whitii, new species, p. 22 + Plate III, Figure 6).
Gray JE (1845). Catalogue of the Specimens of Lizards in the Collection of the British Museum. London: Trustees of the British Museum. (Edward Newman, printer). xxviii + 289 pp. (Homonota, new genus, p. 171).

 
Geckos
Lizard genera
Taxa named by John Edward Gray